James Charles Park-Johnson (born 14 September 1998) is an English former first-class cricketer.

Park-Johnson was born at Kendal in September 1998. He was educated at Sedbergh School, before going up to Anglia Ruskin University. While studying at Anglia Ruskin, he made two appearances in first-class cricket for Cambridge MCCU in 2019, against Essex and Nottinghamshire. He scored 28 runs in his two matches, in addition to taking a single wicket, that of Essex's Ravi Bopara, with his right-arm medium pace bowling.

Notes and references

External links

1998 births
Living people
Sportspeople from Kendal
Cricketers from Cumbria
People educated at Sedbergh School
Alumni of Anglia Ruskin University
English cricketers
Cambridge MCCU cricketers